Shadbondari (also Romanized as Shādbondarī) is a village in Kurka Rural District, in the Central District of Astaneh-ye Ashrafiyeh County, Gilan Province, Iran. At the 2006 census, its population was 73, in 23 families.

References 

Populated places in Astaneh-ye Ashrafiyeh County